William Albert Edgerton (born August 16, 1941)  is an American former Major League Baseball left-handed pitcher. He pitched for the Kansas City Athletics (1966–1967) and Seattle Pilots (1969). Edgerton was born in South Bend, Indiana.
 
During a three-year baseball career, Edgerton compiled one win, 11 strikeouts, and a 4.79 earned run average in 17 games (one start).

Following his career in the majors, Edgerton pitched in the Orioles, Brewers, and Dodgers minor league systems. He played his final season in 1971.

References

External links
, or Retrosheet, or Pelota Binaria (Venezuelan Winter League)

1941 births
Living people
Baseball players from South Bend, Indiana
Birmingham Barons players
Burlington Bees players
Cardenales de Lara players
American expatriate baseball players in Venezuela
Dallas Rangers players
Evansville Triplets players
Florida Instructional League Athletics players
Kansas City Athletics players
Lewiston Broncs players
Major League Baseball pitchers
Mobile A's players
Portland Beavers players
Quincy Jets players
Rochester Red Wings players
San Diego Padres (minor league) players
Seattle Angels players
Seattle Pilots players
Spokane Indians players
Vancouver Mounties players